"Nice to Luv You" is the first single by Canadian rock group 54-40 from the band's 1992 album, Dear Dear.

Charts

References

External links

1992 singles
54-40 songs
1992 songs
Columbia Records singles